The women's individual pursuit C1–3 took place on 8 September 2016.

The event began with a qualifying race over 3000m. Each of the eleven athletes competed individually in a time trial basis. The fastest two riders raced for the gold medal and the third and fourth fastest riders raced for the bronze.

Preliminaries
Q: Qualifier
WR: World Record
PR: Paralympic Record

Finals 
Gold medal match

Bronze medal match

References

Women's pursuit C1-3